Flo is a health app that provides menstruation tracking, cycle prediction, and information concerning preparation for conception, pregnancy, early motherhood and menopause.

The application is available on iOS and Android. Flo has over 200 million downloads worldwide and 48 million monthly active users as of September 2022.

Company History 
Flo was co-founded in 2015 by Dmitry and Yuri Gurski, in Belarus. Dmitry served as the company's CEO.

In 2016, the company raised $1 million in seed round funding from Flint Capital and Haxus Venture Fund.

In 2017, Flo received an investment of $5 million from Flint Capital, model Natalia Vodianova and other angel investors. Vodianova also helped develop Flo's "Let’s Talk About it. Period" worldwide awareness campaign, which sought to break the taboo surrounding women's health and periods. In December 2017, Flo began working with the United Nations Population Fund (UNFPA) to spread awareness about women's reproductive and sexual health issues. Also in 2017, Flo launched a question and answer service within the app that allowed users to discuss issues with experts and other users.

In 2018, Flo received an investment of $6 million from Mangrove Capital Partners, with participation from Flint Capital and Haxus, giving the company a valuation of $200 million.

In mid-2019, Flo received an additional investment of $7.5 million. Founders Fund was one of the main investors in the round, known for investing in startups such as Airbnb and SpaceX. In September 2019, Privacy International published a report regarding data sharing for a number of period-tracking apps. Following a number of data-sharing controversies in the industry, Flo and four other apps implemented measures to protect user's data from third parties. A Flo spokesperson stated in an interview with Bustle, "we take extreme measures to ensure that individual user data and privacy rights are protected."

In early September 2021, Flo announced it closed $50M in a Series B financing, bringing the total capital raised to $65 million and company valuation to $800M. VNV Global and Target Global both led the round, with previous investments in Babylon Health, Lyft, Delivery Hero, and Bird.

Flo Chief Executive Officer, Dmitry Gurski said the new developments will aim to provide advanced cycle insights and symptom patterns in order to help people "understand if what they are experiencing is considered to be okay, and as a result help users proactively improve their overall health.” He also added that he is looking to hire 200 people, including around 100 roles based in London.

Application and community 
Flo was initially created as a period and ovulation tracking application, but later, it developed into a health partner for millions of women. The application covers all phases of a reproductive cycle, including the start of menstruation (teens), cycle tracking, preparation for conception, pregnancy, early motherhood, menopause. It uses artificial intelligence for accurate cycle predictions.

Flo users get access to a calendar to receive reminders of upcoming menstrual cycles and maintain a record of various other health symptoms such as contraceptive methods, vaginal discharge, water intake, pains, mood swings, and sexual activity.

As the app grew, so did the number of features. A community section was added in 2017, which allows users to anonymously answer and ask questions on health issues and creates a wider support community regarding women's health. At the end of 2018, Flo launched a PCOS Health Assistant, a self-assessment tool that uses an algorithm to detect whether certain combinations of user self-identified symptoms could be associated with a potential risk of Polycystic Ovary Syndrome.

Content on the app is reviewed by a board of medical professionals, on behalf of Flo Health. The board advises the developers on medical-related issues, with advisors consisting of professional GB/GYN's and MDs. The expertise provided by the board helps users identify other medical issues that can be similar to menstrual side-effects. The app also aims to increase awareness of conditions that can often be confused for period symptoms, such as Heavy Menstrual Bleeding and PCOS.

Culture and menstruation 
Founders and medical professionals associated with Flo have spoken about menstruation taboo in various countries and cultures. In partnership with investor Natalia Vodianova, Flo launched the campaign in 2017, "Let's Talk About it. Period." Flo Health has invested in researching taboos and cultural differences for women. In 2019, Flo announced they had completed a survey of 200,000 women globally, as a wider study into period poverty. The study found a number of common problems, such as 34% of those surveyed believing that period poverty is only an issue in developing countries.

Flo collaborated with the United Nations Population Fund's (UNFPA) sexual and reproductive health agency in a project assist women with disabilities. As a UNFPA partner, Flo took part in the Nairobi Summit for International Conference on Population and Development (ICPD) and committed to advancing women's reproductive health.

Similar partnerships were agreed with European Board and College of Obstetrics and Gynaecology (EBCOG) to develop educational materials and also contribute to awareness about women's health.

Privacy & Security 
In February 2019, it emerged that Flo had been sending users' health data to Facebook. The data was sent without users' informed consent, and in violation of Facebook's developer policies.

Later in February 2019, Flo said that it had released an update for its iOS and Android apps that would stop them from sending any further sensitive personal data to external analytics companies such as Facebook, and that it would conduct a privacy audit. In response to the allegations of private data misuse, a complaint was filed against Flo Health, Inc by the FTC. The complaint ultimately lead to Flo and the FTC reaching a settlement.

Anonymous Mode 
In September, 2022, as a response to Roe v. Wade being overturned, Flo released a feature called “Anonymous Mode”. This mode allows users to access the app without any personal data, and technical identifiers, marking Flo to be the first female health app to take this level of privacy and security.

Flo has partnered with Cloudflare, the same company that Apple worked with for the iCloud Private Relay, to integrate an Oblivious HTTP system, App Relay Gateway, which ensures that no single party processing user data for Anonymous Mode accounts has complete information on both who the user is and what they are trying to access.

The feature has been positively perceived—it was praised by Andrew Crawford, senior policy council at Center for Democracy & Technology.

Technical details of Anonymous Mode implementation Flo has covered in a white paper with the purpose of encouraging other companies to raise the bar when it comes to privacy and security principles.

Recognition 
Flo is a CES 2019 Innovation Awards Honouree in the Software and Mobile Applications category.

References

External links 
Official Website

Health software
Menstrual cycle
Mobile applications
Women's health